In cell biology, Dullard protein is a protein coding gene involved in neural development. It is a member of DXDX(T/V) phosphatase family and is a potential regulator of neural tube development in Xenopus. The gene promotes neural development by inhibiting Bone Morphogenetic Proteins (BMPs). Dullard is also known as CTDnep1, which stands for CTD nuclear envelope phosphatase 1. This gene is relatively small and only contains 244 amino acids.

Description
Dullard is also known as CTDnep1, which stands for CTD nuclear envelope phosphatase 1. It is a protein coding gene, which include phosphatase activity and protein serine/threonine phosphatase activity. This gene is relatively small and only contains 244 amino acids. Dullard protein or CTDnep1 encodes a protein serine/threonine phosphatase and dephosphoroylates LPIN1 and LPIN2. LPIN1 and LPIN2 catalyze the reaction of the conversion of phosphatidic acid to diacylglyerol. The reaction can affect and change the lipid concentration of the endoplasmic reticulum and the nucleus.

Dullard and BNP signaling
Neural development happens in the dorsal ectoderm. In the genus Xenopus, over expression of Dullard undergoes apoptosis in early development. Dullard helps promote Ubiquitin by proteosomal degradation. Dullard mRNA is derived from maternal genes and is localized within the animal neural hemisphere. Functioning negatively for the regulation of Bone Morphogenetic Proteins (BMPs), Dullard conserves the C-terminal region of NLI-IF, in which is fairly dominant in cellular functions. Dullard is essential for inhibiting BMP receptor activation during Xenopus neuralization.

Human Dullard
Human Dullard has shown that the protein has two membrane spanning regions. One end is the N-terminal end, which helps localize the protein to the nuclear envelope. Dullard dephosphorylates the mammalian phospatidic acid phosphatase, lipin. Dullard participates in a unique phosphatase cascade regulating nuclear membrane biogenesis, and that this cascade is conserved from yeast to mammals. There is belief that Dullard may have other targets that is not only associated with the nuclear envelope. In recent studies, dullard interacts with BMP type 1 to inhibit dependent phosphorylation. This can conclude that it is a potential source for regulating the level of BMP signaling and can affect germ cell specification.

References

Proteins